Gurrundah is a locality in the Upper Lachlan Shire, New South Wales, Australia. It lies on the eastern side of the Crookwell–Gunning road about 22 south of Crookwell and 26 km north of Gunning. The Gullen Range Wind Farm lies in the east of the locality above the upper Wollondilly River.

References

Upper Lachlan Shire
Localities in New South Wales
Southern Tablelands